Lheedharifulhu is a 1996 Maldivian film written and directed by Ahmed Sharumeel. Produced by Makhma Hussain Rasheed under Farivaa Films, the film stars Abdul Rahman Rauf, Zaneena, Ahmed Sharumeel, Mariyam Haajara and Haajara Abdul Kareem in pivotal roles. It narrates the downturn of a woman followed by hatred for her daughter-in-law.

Premise
After completing his studies, Sameer returns to his homeland as the headmaster of the school. Sameer's mother, Dhon Didi arranges his marriage with his childhood friend, Shehenaz, who is born and raised in a wealthy family. Dhon Didi's plans backfire when Sameer begins a romantic relationship with an underprivileged woman, Fathimath Sameeha. Dejected, she declares war against the married couple and determines to make Sameeha's life miserable at any cost. Dhon Didi conspires to prove Sameeha's infidelity, all of which ultimately works in favor of the couple.

However, as the couple manages to survive the worst days of their lives, Sameer falls from a high tree and becomes handicapped which leads him to resign from his post. Sameeha, now pregnant, added with their financial instabilities, is thrown from the house when Sameer dies from further injuries to his previous wound. Shehenaz marries Sameer's younger brother, Nawaz, to avenge Sameeha for snatching her first love, Sameer. The news of Shehenaz and Nawaz's marriage was anticipated to bring fortune to Dhon Didi. However, things did not work out as her plans, when the indolent daughter-in-law treats Dhon Didi as a servant in the house.

Cast 
 Abdul Rahman Rauf as Nawaz
 Zaneena as Shehenaz
 Ahmed Sharumeel as Ahmed Sameer
 Mariyam Haajara as Fathimath Sameeha
 Haajara Abdul Kareem as Dhondhee
 Abdul Rasheed
 Mohamed Naeem
 Waheedha
 Mariyam Ali
 Moosa Rushdhee
 Ahmed Ibrahim
 Thuhthu Maniku
 Hassan Didi

Soundtrack

Response
Upon release, the film received mainly positive reviews from critics where the performance of Haajara Abdul Kareem was particularly noted for her realistic presentation of an "aggressive and insistent" mother-in-law.

References

Maldivian drama films
1996 films
1996 drama films
Dhivehi-language films